Google Public Alerts was an online notification service owned by Google.org that sends safety alerts (weather watches, warnings, advisories, safety instructions, etc.) and launched to the United States, Australia, Canada, Colombia, Japan, Taiwan, Indonesia, Mexico, and Brazil on October 30, 2012, and to the Philippines on November 12, 2014. It is part of the Google Crisis Response team and publishes content from its partners of each country. If you activate Google Now, you can see suitable weather and public safety on Google Search and Google Maps.

On June 3, 2014, Public Alerts connected with Twitter to display tweets about the current event to keep people safe via special sources. Google called it "extreme public alerts" because it can answer questions, such as whether schools are closed. Google says "it's only enabled in majorly English-speaking countries".

Google Public Alerts was discontinued by Google.org on March 31, 2021, though the functionality will be available on other Google services such as Google Search and Google Maps.

Partners

United States 
 National Weather Service
 United States Geological Survey
 West Coast and Alaska Tsunami Warning Center
 AMBER alerts from the National Center for Missing and Exploited Children
 Nixle

Australia 
 New South Wales Rural Fire Service

Canada 
 Environment and Climate Change Canada

England 
 Environment Agency

Germany 
 Deutscher Wetterdienst

Colombia 
 Unidad Nacional para la Gestión del Riesgo de Desastres (National Unit for Disaster Risk Management)
 Instituto de Hidrología, Meteorología y Estudios Ambientales (Institute of Hydrology, Meteorology and Environmental Studies)

Japan 
 Japan Meteorological Agency

Taiwan 
 Central Weather Bureau
 Water Resource Agency
 Soil and Water Conversation Bureau
 Directorate General of Highways
 National Science and Technology Center for Disaster Reduction

Indonesia 
 Badan Meteorologi, Klimatologi, dan Geofisika (Indonesian Agency for Meteorology, Climatology and Geophysics)
 Badan Nasional Penanggulangan Bencana (Indonesian National Board for Disaster Management)

Mexico 
 Servicio Meteorológico Nacional (National Weather Service)

Philippines 
 PAG-ASA (Philippine Atmospheric, Geophysical and Astronomical Services Administration)

References 

Public Alerts
Public Alerts
Weather warnings and advisories